Zoran Glomazić (born June 12, 1963) is a Montenegrin basketball coach who serves as a head coach for the KK Milenijum of the Montenegrin Basketball League.

Coaching career 
On August 28, 2017, Glomazić became a head coach for the Montenegrin team Teodo Tivat. On February 4, 2018, he terminated contract with Teodo by mutual agreement. On March 28, 2018, he was named a head coach for Sutjeska. He left Sutjeska in July 2020.

He then served as head coach of Zrinjski Mostar, and from November 2021, he is head coach of KK Milenijum of Montenegrin Basketball League.

References

External links 
 Glamozic ABA League Profile
 Coach Profile at eurobasket.com

1963 births
Living people
KK Teodo Tivat coaches
KK Sutjeska coaches
Montenegrin basketball coaches
Sportspeople from Nikšić